The River Gweebarra is a river in north County Donegal, Ireland.

Course
Streams enter Lough Barra from Crockfadda and Moylenanav. From there the River Gweebarra flows southwestwards between the Derryveagh Mountains and Glendowan Mountains, crossing the R252 at Doocharry. From here it widens, being bridged by the N56 south of Lettermacaward. It enters the Gweebarra Bay which flows on into the North Atlantic Ocean.

Wildlife

The River Gweebarra is a brown trout and salmon fishery. Other species include Sand goby, European flounder, European eel, plaice, Fifteen-spined stickleback, Five-bearded rockling, Lesser sandeel, Two-spotted goby, Greater pipefish, Long-spined sea scorpion, Three-spined stickleback, turbot and pollack.

See also

Rivers of Ireland

References

Rivers of County Donegal